The Sligo Football League is an annual Gaelic Athletic Association club league competition between the lower ranking Sligo clubs, operating in Division 3 of the league. Since its inception in 1979 up to 2003, it was regarded as Division 2 of the league. Since 2004 this has been altered, with a number of Intermediate teams playing in the higher Divisions (1A and 1B), and Division 2 itself was split in 2006, into Division 2A and Division 2B. The Divisions have been renamed for 2008, and are now Divisions 1 to 5.

Enniscrone are the most successful club, having won on 4 occasions, the last in 2004. Naomh Molaise Gaels, twice previous winners under their old incarnation as Grange/Cliffoney, won in 2008 after defeating St John's in the final.

Top Winners (Division 3, ex Division 2)

Roll of honour

References
Sligo GAA 125 History (2010)

External links
Official Sligo Website
Sligo on Hoganstand
Sligo Club GAA

3